The Terry Flanagan Memorial Award was an annual award given out at the conclusion of the Central Collegiate Hockey Association regular season to the player who best demonstrates perseverance, dedication and courage while overcoming severe adversity as voted by the coaches of each CCHA team.

The Award was named after Terry Flanagan who was an assistant coach at Bowling Green for seven seasons before succumbing to cancer in 1991 at the age of 35. Flanagan has another award named in his honor that is given out by the American Hockey Coaches Association to a coach for his career body of work. The first recipient of that award was Terry Flanagan himself in 1997.

The Terry Flanagan Memorial Award was first awarded in 1993 and every year thereafter until 2013 when the CCHA was dissolved as a consequence of the Big Ten forming its men's ice hockey conference.

Award winners

Winners by school

Winners by position

See also
CCHA Awards
Terry Flanagan Award

References

General

Specific 

College ice hockey trophies and awards in the United States
Bowling Green Falcons ice hockey
Awards established in 1993
Awards disestablished in 2014